Chilli Beans is a Brazilian brand of sunglasses, and eyeglasses founded in 1997 by the businessman Caito Maia. The company is the second largest in the segment, behind only the Luxottica Group. It is the most successful company of the branch in Latin America. The Gávea Investment Group bought 30% of the company for about R$100 million, indicating that the company is worth about R$330 million. The company's turnover was approximately R$550 million. The brand has approximately 700 stores in Brazil, in addition to owning stores in 9 other countries.

References

External links

Companies based in São Paulo
Sunglasses
Brazilian brands
Manufacturing companies established in 1997
Eyewear companies of Brazil
Eyewear brands of Brazil